The Masterson Inheritance was an improvised comedy series broadcast on BBC Radio 4 from  1993 to 1995 billed as "an improvised historical saga of a family at war with itself."  There were three series and two Christmas specials.  It was broadcast from 1993 to 1995. From time to time, repeats of the show are broadcast on BBC Radio 4 Extra.

In each programme, the cast members – Josie Lawrence, Phelim McDermott, Paul Merton, Caroline Quentin, Lee Simpson, and Jim Sweeney – would be given a particular historical setting, and, incorporating suggestions from the audience, would improvise that episode in the saga of the Masterson family.  One episode, The Marooned Mastersons, was never broadcast but is available on Jim Sweeney's website.

Music
Each episode of the saga was introduced by and ended with Erich Korngold's Hollywood-style title music from the 1946 film noir Deception.

Critical reaction
The Independent reckoned the show was genuinely improvised, due to the "air of suppressed panic", even if the improvisation revolved around a small number of choices. It questioned the longevity of the format once people got bored with listening to their mistakes.

Episode list

References

External links
The Masterson Inheritance fansite
Episode listing from epguides.com

Masterson Inheritance
Masterson Inheritance